The Bahraini King's Cup is an end of season cup competition involving teams from the Bahraini Premier League.

The 2009 edition was the 53rd to be held.

Muharraq Club were the 2008 holders and retained the title. It was also Muharraq's 4th title of the domestic campaign.

First round

The first round of the competition involves the lowest 6 teams in the Bahrain Classification Soccer League 2008-09 season. Games were played over 15 and 16 May.

|colspan="3" style="background-color:#99CCCC"|15 May 2009

|-
|colspan="3" style="background-color:#99CCCC"|16 May 2009

|}

Round of 16

|colspan="3" style="background-color:#99CCCC"|21 June 2009

|-
|colspan="3" style="background-color:#99CCCC"|22 June 2009

|-
|colspan="3" style="background-color:#99CCCC"|23 June 2009

|-
|colspan="3" style="background-color:#99CCCC"|24 June 2009

|}

Quarter-finals

|colspan="3" style="background-color:#99CCCC"|27 June 2009

|-
|colspan="3" style="background-color:#99CCCC"|28 June 2009

|-
|colspan="3" style="background-color:#99CCCC"|29 June 2009

|}

Semi-finals

|colspan="3" style="background-color:#99CCCC"|2 July 2009

|-
|colspan="3" style="background-color:#99CCCC"|3 July 2009

|}

Final

Bahraini King's Cup seasons
King's Cup
Bahrain

fr:Coupe de Bahreïn de football